This article lists the results of the Scotland women's national football team from their first official match in 1972 to 1999. The list excludes unofficial matches, where the opposition did not have full international status or it was played behind closed doors.

1970s

1972

1973

1974

1975

1976

1977

1978

1979

1980s

1980

1981

1982

1983

1984

1985

1986

1987

1988

1989

1990s

1990

1991

1992

1993

1994

1995

1996

1997

1998

1999

See also
Scotland women's national football team 2000–09 results
Scotland women's national football team 2010–19 results
Scotland women's national football team 2020–29 results

References

External links
Women's A Squad Results
Scotland women's national team results summary (since 1982) at worldfootball

1972
1972–73 in Scottish football
1973–74 in Scottish football
1974–75 in Scottish football
1975–76 in Scottish football
1976–77 in Scottish football
1977–78 in Scottish football
1978–79 in Scottish football
1979–80 in Scottish football
1980–81 in Scottish football
1981–82 in Scottish football
1982–83 in Scottish football
1983–84 in Scottish football
1984–85 in Scottish football
1985–86 in Scottish football
1986–87 in Scottish football
1987–88 in Scottish football
1988–89 in Scottish football
1989–90 in Scottish football
1990–91 in Scottish football
1991–92 in Scottish football
1992–93 in Scottish football
1993–94 in Scottish football
1994–95 in Scottish football
1995–96 in Scottish football
1996–97 in Scottish football
1997–98 in Scottish football
1998–99 in Scottish football
1999–2000 in Scottish football